Óscar Palomino (born 18 April 1972) is a Spanish boxer. He competed in the men's lightweight event at the 1992 Summer Olympics.

References

1972 births
Living people
Spanish male boxers
Olympic boxers of Spain
Boxers at the 1992 Summer Olympics
Boxers from Barcelona
Lightweight boxers